Amphibolips quercusostensackenii is a species of gall wasp in the family Cynipidae. It is found throughout eastern North America.

Description 
This species induces globular galls on the leaves of members of the red oak group (Quercus sect. Lobatae). These galls are roughly 7 to 9 mm in diameter, and contain a central filament-supported cell where pupation occurs.

Life History 
These galls develop in the spring. Adults are described to have emerged from the galls between 8 to 15 July in the Chicago area.

Taxonomy 
This species was originally placed in the genus Andricus. However, a 2002 review reclassified it to the closely-related genus Amphibolips based on the morphology of the adult wasp.

Gallery

References 

Cynipidae
Oak galls
Gall-inducing insects
Insects described in 1863
Taxa named by Homer Franklin Bassett